The Thunderbolts are an antihero team appearing in American comic books published by Marvel Comics. The team consists mostly of reformed supervillains. Created by Kurt Busiek and Mark Bagley, the team first appeared in The Incredible Hulk #449 (January 1997).

Publication history
The Thunderbolts first appeared in The Incredible Hulk (vol. 2) #449 (January 1997) and were created by Kurt Busiek and Mark Bagley.

The Thunderbolts were first presented, both to readers and to the Marvel Universe, as a group of super-powered figures who became heroes to help protect the world when the Avengers were declared dead after the events of the 1996 "Onslaught" crossover. The final page of the first issue of their comic book, however, revealed that the Thunderbolts were actually the Masters of Evil in disguise, a surprise twist carefully guarded by Marvel.

In subsequent storylines, the group rejects their leader Baron Helmut Zemo and attempts to become heroes in their own right, eventually under the leadership of the Avenger Hawkeye.

Themes of redemption and the nature of heroism are often featured in Thunderbolts comics. The book has also garnered critical praise for its use of secondary characters from other Marvel Comics and its use of continuity-themed storytelling.

The Thunderbolts was an original concept created for Marvel by Busiek and Bagley. Most of the characters used in the final concept were reimagined versions of existing Marvel characters, with additional original characters for the series developed by Busiek and designed by Bagley. The pair also created the new heroic identities for the Masters of Evil. Busiek recalled:

The actual origin of Thunderbolts came when I used to live in New Jersey and drive to New England to visit my parents. To keep myself awake, I'd give myself books to write, and work out about two to three years of continuity. One trip, I assigned myself Avengers, and came up with the plan that the Masters of Evil would ultimately conquer them by posing as new heroes and slowly replacing them. At the time, I thought it was a neat idea, and filed it away.

While Busiek's original reluctance was because he deemed readers would not have liked replacing the established characters and then having the new ones being villains – "Doing that with one character, like what Marv Wolfman did with Terra, made a great sting, but doing it on a team-wide scale wouldn't work." – seeing a world devoid of many heroes following "Onslaught" made him revive the concept. The Thunderbolts first appeared as a team in The Incredible Hulk (vol. 2) #449 (January 1997), written by Peter David and illustrated by Mike Deodato. Originally intended to be a similar team known as the "Echelon," the synchronization of the plans led to the Thunderbolts being used instead as a "teaser" for their own series. No mention was made of the connection between the Thunderbolts and the Masters of Evil in this appearance, save perhaps for the Hulk almost recognizing Meteorite's voice (having fought Moonstone before). The team also appeared in a one-shot called Tales of the Marvel Universe. The twist would not be revealed until the first issue of their own series.

Soon after the publication of The Incredible Hulk (vol. 2) #449, the team's own series premiered. The first issue, cover dated April 1997, was played largely as a straight superhero story, until the revelation of the Thunderbolts' true nature on the last page of the comic. This is considered one of the most well-conceived plot twists in the history of American comic books, with Wizard magazine readers voting it "Comics' Greatest Moment of 1997" and later, in 1998, placing it at #11 on a list of "The 25 Greatest Comic Moments Ever". Marvel managed to keep the secret of the Thunderbolts' true villainous identities tightly under wraps before the book launched. When word got out, the first issue sold out so quickly that Marvel not only offered a second printing, but also did a "mini-trade paperback" collecting the first two issues. Fabian Nicieza replaced Busiek in issue #34. Patrick Zircher, after a couple of fill-ins, replaced Bagley in issue #51.

Despite critical acclaim, the book was reformatted with Thunderbolts #76 (March 2003), removing the entire cast and creative team and replacing it with a brand new set of characters, along with a new writer, John Arcudi. The move was done in part due to Marvel Editor-in-Chief Joe Quesada's desire to emulate the success he had with X-Force, which was reformatted with a new cast of characters and status quo that was successful in sales and popularity. However, the new direction for the series—an underground fighting circuit that employed predominantly newly created super-villain characters—was a commercial failure and canceled after six issues.

In 2004, Marvel Comics launched a limited series titled Avengers/Thunderbolts, which continued one year after the events of issue #75. The limited series ran for the same number of issues as the reformatted Thunderbolts arc.

Soon after the completion of Avengers/Thunderbolts, Marvel Comics launched a second series featuring the characters with New Thunderbolts #1 (January 2005). The storyline continued the events from Avengers/Thunderbolts as well as the fall-out of "Avengers Disassembled" and returned to the original series concept, though with a roster that lacked many fan favorites (such as Baron Zemo, Moonstone, and Techno). With the combination of the eighty-one issues of the first series and the first eighteen issues of New Thunderbolts, the series reverted to its original numbering with Thunderbolts #100.

Thunderbolts #110 saw another change to the direction of the series, with writer Warren Ellis introducing a new team of Thunderbolts, villains working for the government, tasked with capturing unregistered superheroes. Ellis has stated that he chose to approach the series "gently, but directly from a political agenda" and the relaunch was closely tied to Marvel's commercially successful Civil War event, with the team serving as a dark reflection of the event's controversial ending. The Thunderbolts also feature in the Spider-Man storyline "New Ways to Die", which is the first proper showdown between him and the team.

Ellis stepped aside in issue #121 and was replaced by Christos Gage, who wrote three one-shots and a four-issue tie-in with Secret Invasion. At the 2008 San Diego Comic Con, Andy Diggle was announced as the new ongoing writer, starting in issue #126 (November 2008) with a two issue story "Burning Down the House" which cleared the way for the introduction of a new team line-up. This team debuted in Thunderbolts #128-129, a story that dealt with "Dark Reign", the Secret Invasion aftermath, which was followed by "Magnum Opus", a 4-issue crossover with Deadpool (vol. 2). Miguel Sepulvida took over art duties with Thunderbolts #133 and Jeff Parker became the new writer with issue #138. Parker then piloted the title through the end of "Dark Reign", featuring a crossover with the Agents of Atlas team he was also writing, and into "Siege", following which the team was revamped again. Parker announced that "the status quo of the team undergoes a major overhaul for the new era to come. It's going to synthesize a lot of what readers like about recent history and re-instill some elements from the early days of the book."

The Heroic Age team debuted in Thunderbolts #144 with a new main artist, Kev Walker. The title crossed over with Avengers Academy in issue #147, which was bookended by Avengers Academy #3 and #4. The series then went on to cross over with the Daredevil storyline "Shadowland" in issues #148-149, with artist Declan Shalvey stepping in for the two issues. The series then crossed over with the "Fear Itself" storyline in issues #158-163.

The Thunderbolts comic book was renamed Dark Avengers beginning with issue #175, but the creative team remained unchanged. Dark Avengers ended with issue #190.

As part of Marvel NOW!, a new Thunderbolts series was launched featuring a new team composed of Red Hulk, Deadpool, Elektra, Venom, and Punisher. This series ended in October 2014 with issue #32.

Fictional team biography

Baron Helmut Zemo's Thunderbolts

Baron Helmut Zemo summoned several of his former allies from the prior incarnations of the Masters of Evil during a rescue attempt of Goliath (the former bodyguard to Baron Heinrich Zemo). The summoned members included Beetle, Fixer, Moonstone and Screaming Mimi. Zemo took the accidental gathering as an omen, and decided to reform the Masters of Evil and attack the Avengers. Before they could strike, the Avengers, and the Fantastic Four were apparently killed by the villain Onslaught.

The death of the Avengers and Fantastic Four created an opportunity for Zemo and the Masters of Evil. Zemo realized that the world needed superpowered champions, and that his team could fill that need. By posing as superheroes, the Masters of Evil could gain the public trust and build a position of power that rivaled the status of the Avengers. Once they had gained the public's faith, Zemo believed they could gain access to all the secrets of the Avengers and S.H.I.E.L.D. once they were in ultimate power. Zemo then planned to sell the secrets they found to the criminal underworld.

The villains adopted new heroic costumes and codenames. Baron Zemo became the patriotic American Citizen V, patterned after a WWII hero his father killed. Former Human Torch and Spider-Man foe Beetle became MACH-1, using a new high-tech suit designed by Fixer. Fixer became the gadget-wielding Techno. Long time Avengers enemy Goliath became the powerhouse Atlas. Screaming Mimi became Songbird, her damaged abilities aided by technology Zemo had adapted from ex-Master Klaw. Moonstone was secretly freed from the Vault and added to the team by Zemo, who extracted a promise of loyalty from her. She was to be Zemo's personal enforcer against any betrayal committed by the others. She took the alias Meteorite. Calling themselves the Thunderbolts, the six new 'heroes' were ready for action.

The team found tremendous success as superheroic champions. The public began to think of the Thunderbolts as heroes. After several adventures, some of the villains began to think of themselves the same way. Dallas Riordan, an aide to the Mayor of New York, befriended the new heroes.

Jolt, an Asian American teenage girl whose entire family was killed by Onslaught and was experimented on by Arnim Zola, soon joined the team after she came to the Baxter Building seeking the help of the FF. Jolt, however, was not a supervillain, with the young girl honestly believing that her new friends were heroes (Zemo used the opportunity to create the team's new history). Soon after the addition of Jolt, Techno's neck was broken in battle with the Elements of Doom. Techno then seemingly transferred his mind into an android body built from his tech-pack.

Just as Zemo's plans were about to come to fruition, everything unravelled. To the astonishment of the entire world, the Fantastic Four and the Avengers returned. Faced with the return of the lost heroes, Zemo revealed the true nature of the Thunderbolts to the world. Ostensibly, he did this to ensure the loyalty of the team by ruining their chances of becoming heroes.

The Thunderbolts (minus the android Techno) turned on Zemo for his betrayal. In the ensuing battle, Zemo and Techno used a mind control device to turn the Avengers and Fantastic Four against the remaining Thunderbolts, who, with the help of the size-changing Atlas- as well as Iron Man, who had designed his armour to make himself more resistant to mind control- ultimately rallied and freed the other heroes. Together, they defeated Zemo and Techno. Unbeknownst to his teammates, Atlas helped the wounded Zemo escape, while Techno fled under his own power.

Amidst this chaos, Meteorite decided to return to her old identity. She altered her costume and changed her codename back to Moonstone. After a brief stop-over in an alternate dimension, the team learned that Moonstone had no intention of reforming and becoming a superhero. She told them she only turned against Zemo out of self-preservation.

Upon their return to Earth, the team set up shop in Colorado and pondered their next move.

Marvel's Most Wanted
Now fugitives, new members soon joined the Thunderbolts. These members included the former Avenger Hawkeye, and later a young African American hero named Charcoal who had previously fought the team, having been created by a "Create a character" contest in Wizard Magazine. Hawkeye convinced his new teammates they would be pardoned if MACH-1, who had murdered someone as the Beetle (as the only member of the team who had ever actually killed anyone), turned himself in to authorities. The team considered joining the mysterious Crimson Cowl's new Masters of Evil instead. Ultimately, the Thunderbolts followed Hawkeye's advice. MACH-1 turned himself in and pleaded guilty to murder. Even with MACH-1's surrender, the U.S. Government refused to pardon the group.

The Thunderbolts then defeated the Crimson Cowl's Masters of Evil and took over their headquarters. After unmasking the Crimson Cowl, the team discovered that she was their old friend Dallas Riordan. In truth, Riordan was not the Crimson Cowl. The real Crimson Cowl was Justine Hammer. Riordan had been framed by Hammer to take the fall for the Cowl's crimes. While Riordan was not the Crimson Cowl, she did have her own secret identity. Riordan was actually the new Citizen V, leader of the secret V-Battalion. Riordan decided to keep her secret to avoid exposure of the group. She was sent to jail for the Crimson Cowl's crimes, but was later rescued by the V-Battalion.

Changes
While exploring their new headquarters, the Thunderbolts discovered Ogre. Ogre was a former member of the villainous Factor Three, the original owners of the base. Factor Three made Ogre the new base caretaker after they disbanded. This also left him with custody of Humus Sapien, a dangerous mutant teenager that Factor Three had kidnapped and placed in suspended animation.

Ogre was accepted as a member of the Thunderbolts. Soon after, Techno attacked him, placed him in stasis, and assumed his identity. At the same time, MACH-1 was freed from prison in exchange for stealing some top secret weapons technology from evil industrialist Justin Hammer. MACH-1 returned to the Thunderbolts after gaining his freedom thanks to Hawkeye making a deal with the Commission that had released him that he would continue officially serving his sentence while returning to the team. Upon his return, Techno upgraded MACH-1's armor, and used another device to change his features so that others wouldn't realize he was the same person as the original identity. MACH-1 was now MACH-2.

During this time, the Thunderbolts joined forces with the Avengers against the latest plan of Count Nefaria, as he intended to detonate an ionic bomb, which will transform millions of people into an ionic state which he can then control, perceiving it as the best way to guarantee that he receives the respect that he feels he deserves. The two teams are drawn into this plan when Nefaria uses his new control of ionic energy to take control of the heroes Wonder Man and Atlas, intending to use them to kill the Avengers. Despite his power, he is stopped by the combined efforts of the Avengers, the Thunderbolts, and Madame Masque, Masque using a weapon she had developed to disrupt Nefaria's own ionic energy so that the heroes can defeat him.

Meanwhile, Moonstone found herself going through changes. She fell in love with Hawkeye. Soon after, she learned that the spirit of the Kree Moonstone that powered her tried to make her a more honest person. This conflicted with her naturally amoral personality, and slowly made her insane.

The Thunderbolts faced many more challenges. Henry Gyrich sought to destroy the team and Hawkeye. Gyrich changed a brainwashed Jack Monroe into the new Scourge. The Scourge then attempted to assassinate the Thunderbolts one by one. First he killed Jolt. He then traveled to South America and apparently killed Baron Zemo. After this, Scourge broke into the Thunderbolts headquarters and destroyed the robotic Techno. He then killed Atlas by allowing the giant to implode into a storm of ionic energy.

The Redeemers
All four characters apparently killed by Scourge had survived in some form: the robotic Techno had recovered Jolt's body and used her electrical powers to resurrect her from the dead, even while he "died", imbuing her with the knowledge that Hawkeye had failed to get the team pardoned in the process. The Thunderbolts were upset with Hawkeye, but, on unmasking Monroe, decided that confronting Gyrich was more important.

While all this happened, Val Cooper had gathered her own army of heroes she named the Redeemers. This team included a new Citizen V, Atlas' brother Smuggler, and Fixer, who had only copied his mind into his tech-pack as a contingency. The original Norbert P. Ebersol survived his injuries and recovered in secret while the robotic Techno continued on as a Thunderbolt in his place. Leila Davis, the wife of the Ringer, used an updated version of the Beetle armour.

The Redeemers helped the Thunderbolts battle Gyrich, who had acquired experimental nanite technology. Gyrich wanted to use the nanites to kill off all heroes and villains on Earth. Gyrich's scheme was foiled. It was soon revealed that he had been infected with nanites, and had been secretly manipulated by Baron Strucker of the terrorist group HYDRA. Hawkeye tried to use this information as blackmail to get the Thunderbolts pardoned. Gyrich countered that he would tell the public himself about HYDRA's scheme. Ultimately, Gyrich agreed to stay quiet and give the Thunderbolts their pardon. In return, Hawkeye turned himself in for aiding the fugitive heroes. Hawkeye went to prison and the team disbanded.

Eventually, all the others murdered by Jack Monroe returned from the dead. Baron Zemo's mind had been transferred into the comatose body of the man whose role as Citizen V he had usurped in the first place.

Later, after a teleportation accident, Zemo's mind was transferred into Techno's mechanical "Tech-Pack", which had also cybernetically replaced the broken segment of Techno's real body's spine. Atlas was later raised from the dead after a merger with Riordan, who had been crippled in battle with the Crimson Cowl.

Jolt and Charcoal, the only Thunderbolts without criminal records, were assimilated into the Redeemers under the leadership of Captain America and the Zemo-possessed Citizen V. The Redeemers were promptly slaughtered by the Thunderbolts' deadliest foe, the powerful supervillain Graviton with Citizen V, Fixer (who ran away), and Jolt (who re-formed her electric form) as the only survivors of the massacre, although Smuggler and Screamer have since resurfaced.

Rebirth and endings
The Thunderbolts reformed to defeat Graviton. During the fight, several of the team members present (Fixer, Jolt, Moonstone, Jenkins as MACH-3 and the merged Atlas/Dallas Riordan, along with Zemo's mind — accidentally transferred into Fixer's tech-pack by the teleportation) were transported to Counter-Earth, the same parallel Earth the Avengers and Fantastic Four were sent to after their final battle with Onslaught. The Thunderbolts met Counter-Earth versions of Heinrich Zemo, Helmut Zemo and the first Moonstone, the last of which was known as Phantom Eagle.

Under duress — Zemo being able to disable his ability to walk at will — Fixer transferred Zemo's mind from "Tech-Pack" into the body of Zemo's counterpart. Zemo then killed the Counter-Earth version of his father. Soon after, the Thunderbolts stopped the Nazi Germany of Counter-Earth from taking control of all of Counter-Earth's computers. Zemo convinced the team to remain and help rebuild Counter-Earth. The team reluctantly agreed and based themselves in the mobile Counter-Earth Attilan. Then, Moonstone stole the mentally unstable Phantom Eagle's moonstone for herself, boosting her powers to godlike levels.

Back on Earth-616, many things happened. Hawkeye escaped from prison alongside several supervillains just as S.H.I.E.L.D. contacted him with an offer to be freed from prison. Industrialist Justin Hammer died. His daughter Justine (the Crimson Cowl) discovered her father had exposed every supervillain he ever employed to a poison that enslaved their minds. This included members of the Crimson Cowl's Masters of Evil. However, the villain Plantman had helped create the poison and was the only one who could activate it.

With the telepathic terrorist Mentallo serving as a middleman, Hawkeye tried to help Plantman in order to give him to Crimson Cowl. During the escape, Hawkeye watched helplessly as Plantman murdered a prison guard. Before Crimson Cowl could kill Hawkeye or take Plantman, they were rescued by Songbird.

Hawkeye and Songbird then formed a second group of Thunderbolts. He explained to the Crimson Cowl's Masters of Evil that if the Crimson Cowl was not stopped, they would all become her slaves. Plantman, using the codename Blackheath, was their first new member. Most of the members of Crimson Cowl's Masters of Evil also joined, including: Cardinal (now Harrier); Gypsy Moth (now Skein); Man-Killer (now Amazon); and Cyclone, who did not change his codename.

These new Thunderbolts were eventually captured by the Crimson Cowl (who was helped by Cyclone). Crimson Cowl vivisected Plantman. Soon after, Plantman mutated into a plant creature that neutralized the mind-control poison. The group was then sent to the V-Battalion's base. The Counter-Earth group returned to Earth at the V-Battalion base through a rift in space. The new and old teammates were reunited. Jolt stayed on Counter-Earth and joined the Young Allies. Closing the rift between Earth and Counter-Earth destroyed the V-Battalion's base.

In the aftermath, Atlas and Dallas were split into separate bodies, with Dallas retaining the remainder of Atlas' ionic power, allowing her to walk again with enhanced agility and strength. Zemo convinced Hawkeye that he wanted to reform and help the world instead of ruling it. Hawkeye, Amazon and Skein left the team. MACH-3 and Harrier returned to prison. Zemo then revealed to the team that he had lied to Hawkeye and that he still wanted to conquer the world, only to save it from itself. The Thunderbolts comic then shifted focus for six issues.

Avengers/Thunderbolts: The Best Intentions
In 2004, the six issue Avengers/Thunderbolts limited series was launched, picking up a year after the events of Thunderbolts #75. Zemo led the Thunderbolts (now including Dallas Riordan, under the codename Vantage) in an attempt to drain the powers of all superhumans on Earth, using Moonstone. They fought the Avengers, including former Thunderbolt Hawkeye. The Avenger Iron Man infiltrated the Thunderbolts disguised as Cobalt Man. Eventually, all the power absorbed by Moonstone caused her to snap. Jolt returned from Counter-Earth to help stop Moonstone. Finally, Iron Man convinced Hawkeye to lobotomize Moonstone to save the planet.

Zemo vowed revenge against the Thunderbolts and the Avengers for putting Moonstone into a coma. Jolt returned to Counter-Earth. A depowered Blackheath returned to prison. The Fixer fled. Vantage retired to a government job. Songbird was offered reserve membership in the Avengers but turned it down. MACH-3 was paroled from prison and decided to form a new team of Thunderbolts.

The New Thunderbolts
Marvel subsequently launched New Thunderbolts #1. MACH-3 (now called MACH-IV), Atlas and Songbird were now a part of the new Thunderbolts. The team's new recruits included Photon, Speed Demon, Joystick, Blizzard II and the Radioactive Man. The new team has battled Atlantean superhuman terrorist group the Fathom Five and Baron Strucker's HYDRA organization, which funded the team's return.

In "Purple Reign", Swordsman, along with his master, the Purple Man, plotted to enslave New York City by drugging the water supply with the Purple Man's pheromones, which allowed him to control his victims. While the Thunderbolts eventually defeated the Purple Man, before they could interrogate him he was teleported away by his boss, Baron Zemo, who tortured him by inducing rigor mortis in his body and sent him back to prison where his powers would be nullified.

Later, Hank Pym and Warbird offered to pardon the members of the Thunderbolts (who still had outstanding legal problems), if the Thunderbolts would attack and humiliate the New Avengers in public. However, it was later revealed that Pym and Warbird had been blackmailed into doing so.

Only Spider-Woman survived unscathed from the Thunderbolts' sneak attack, beating Joystick senseless. The rest of the team was beaten back before the Thunderbolts left. Songbird told Captain America that the Thunderbolts could beat the New Avengers senseless anytime they wished. In the end, it was revealed that Baron Zemo spearheaded the attack. He did this to humiliate Captain America but also to see how far the Thunderbolts would go for the chance at being pardoned.

Meanwhile, new threats were rising as Fixer resurfaced and recruited both MACH-IV and Blizzard to work with him on a top secret project, which was also run by Zemo. Meanwhile, Speed Demon was confronted by the new female Doctor Spectrum, who was out to reform the Squadron Sinister and take over the world. In the end, Speed Demon quit the Thunderbolts to join Dr. Spectrum while Nighthawk, the former Defender and member of the original Squadron Sinister, was offered membership on the Thunderbolts by Songbird.

Right of Power
Soon after Nighthawk joined the team, the Thunderbolts discovered that Photon's awareness of all space and time brought with it a vision of the destruction of the universe at his hands. As they tried to come to terms with this, they were attacked by a Moonstone puppeteered by Zemo to kill Genis-Vell. When the initial strike failed, the remainder of Zemo's team revealed themselves to the Thunderbolts. Zemo explained that he had used the Moonstones to accelerate Genis' return from death, and in the process made the mistake of siphoning energy from the beginning and end of time itself, caused by inexperience with his Moonstones, creating a link between Genis and the universe that threatened to end existence. Unable to find a way to save both Genis and the universe, he concluded that the only solution was Genis's death.

Unwilling to accept this Songbird led the team in combat against Zemo's group. To prevent the other Thunderbolts from intervening, Zemo revealed that Atlas' brother Smuggler had survived Graviton's massacre of the Redeemers, trapped in the Darkforce dimension. Using the prospect of his release to make Atlas stop the other Thunderbolts from interfering, Zemo bested Genis in battle and, apologizing for both his mistake and the necessary solution, sliced Genis' body into pieces and scattered them through both time and the Darkforce dimension to prevent Genis returning from the dead a third time. He then fully released Smuggler. In the aftermath, Zemo—his face apparently fully healed from Moonstone's attack—and Songbird became allies and lovers.

Civil War: Hero Hunters

The new Thunderbolts engaged and defeated Quicksand in a battle in Denver during the early days of the superhero Civil War. After this, they were summoned to Washington where they met with Iron Man, Mister Fantastic, and Yellowjacket. The three heroes, all supporting the Superhuman Registration Act, informed Zemo that they wanted the Thunderbolts to hunt down supervillains and recruit them to the Pro-Registration cause, which would be their chance at redemption. Unknown to Iron Man, the Thunderbolts had been doing this in secret for three weeks.

Zemo's "Thunderbolt Army" grew rapidly, the team vastly expanding. It now included dozens of other supervillains, including most notably Doctor Octopus, the Wrecker, and Ox. The new team dispersed to battle super-villains, capture them and offer them a choice: join the Thunderbolts or go to prison. Of course, they all chose to join the Thunderbolts. Baron Zemo convinced Captain America not to stop him from battling the Grandmaster, while Nighthawk was revealed as being a spy for the Squadron Sinister inside Captain America's Secret Avengers. Zemo then informed Songbird that in the coming battle, he knew that she would betray him, which she had been planning to do all along, in revenge for his killing of Photon, and he would sacrifice himself to save the world.

Zemo then saved the Wellspring of Power from the Grandmaster, who planned to use it for his own ends. Believing that all of his visions were subject to the flow of time, and that nothing was set in stone, Zemo defeated the Grandmaster, and boasted to his teammates that the power was now all his and theirs. He insisted that he would use it to help the world, despite the consequences for doing so. Songbird, who had temporarily lost her powers during the final battle, was told by Zemo, "now is when your betrayal would have come." The vision of her betrayal turned out to be somewhat correct after all, though. Although she could not use her super-sound, Songbird used a simple opera note to crack the moonstones, sending Zemo into a whirlwind of cosmic time/space. In his final words before he was completely sucked into the vacuum, he screamed out that he would never have hurt a world he worked so hard to save.

Some of the Army of Thunderbolts, consisting of Venom, Lady Deathstrike, Taskmaster, Bullseye, Jester, Jack O'Lantern join Songbird assembled as the Pro-Registration side's task force to hunt down Anti-Registration heroes at the end of Civil War #4, but never officially saw any real combat. The Jester and Jack O'Lantern were later killed by the Punisher. The two were sent to hunt down and capture Spider-Man when he attempted to leave Iron Man's Pro-Registration army.

Bullseye, Taskmaster, and Lady Deathstrike were part of the final battle of Civil War fighting alongside the Pro-Registration side, with Taskmaster wounding Mr. Fantastic when he sought to kill Invisible Woman (a member of the Anti-Registration forces). At the end of the fight, Taskmaster, Bullseye, and Deathstrike were sent to the Negative Zone prison; but Bullseye escaped before he could be sent, and Taskmaster was freed by Deadpool en route to the portal. Deathstrike was either released or somehow escaped on her own. She would go on to battle the X-Men during the events of "Messiah CompleX", a story arc in the X-Men related books.

After the events surrounding the Wellspring, the current team disbanded. MACH-IV and the Fixer were offered jobs from the Commission on Superhuman Activities. Blizzard was released from jail and left the team. Atlas was de-ionized after his encounter with the Wellspring but left catatonic and trapped in his enlarged state while Smuggler, his suit destroyed, took care of him. Joystick was imprisoned for her traitorous actions during the Wellspring debacle and Speed Demon ran away to avoid arrest. Only Songbird, Moonstone, Swordsman and the Radioactive Man, remained on the team.

Zemo: Born Better
In the events of Thunderbolts: Zemo - Born Better mini-series, Baron Zemo found himself lost in time and in Europe, forced to witness the lives and deaths of the previous generations of "Baron Zemos", while being violently thrust forward in time at random points of his adventures. The journey forward in time was a prolonged "moment of clarity" experience for Zemo, who saw his family's true history and not the rose-colored version his father and grandfather had taught him. When he ultimately returned to the present day, Zemo discovered that a distant cousin had been responsible for his return to the present, though at a horrific cost of causing Zemo to jump forward from era to era every time his cousin murdered a family member who shared the same blood as Helmut. When Helmut discovered that his cousin rescued Zemo just so he could kill his infamous relative, Helmut refused to resist, a move that caused his cousin to attempt to take his own life before Zemo convinced him to put down his gun and stop the cycle of violence.

Norman Osborn's Thunderbolts
Thunderbolts #110 featured a new creative team (writer Warren Ellis and artist Mike Deodato) and a new roster and direction for the team. The team was formed under the control of Norman Osborn, and the majority of the roster was made up of villains wishing to redeem themselves.

The new Thunderbolts roster was as follows:
 Norman Osborn (Leader)
 Moonstone (Field leader)
 Bullseye
 Penance
 Radioactive Man
 Songbird
 Swordsman
 Venom

After the Marvel Comics Civil War event, the new Thunderbolts were tasked with tracking down and arresting individuals avoiding the Superhuman Registration Act. Despite the new line-up, many of the themes of the original series continued; in particular, Songbird's decision to cripple Bullseye in retaliation for the villain crippling the super-hero Jack Flag, Norman Osborn's own struggle for redemption as he claimed, and the growing friendship between Songbird and Radioactive Man. Moonstone was made team leader, a move that proved to be disastrous and ultimately led to Songbird resuming control over the team and expanding the group's missions to involve regular super-hero missions besides hunting down unregistered super-heroes.

Due to lengthy delays towards the end of Ellis's run, several one-shot specials and a Penance limited series were launched to fill in the gap. The Penance limited series saw the hero formerly known as Speedball carrying out a complex scheme hatched to gain revenge against Nitro, the man who murdered his teammates the New Warriors, which put him at odds with his new teammates on the Thunderbolts. Several specials advanced other plotlines, such as the mysterious death of Songbird's mother and Swordsman betraying the Thunderbolts by allying himself with Arnim Zola to resurrect his sister, after realizing that Osborn would not use his cloning technology to resurrect Andrea.

Following the events of "Caged Angels", the various Thunderbolt specials (written by Christos Gage), and the Penance limited series, and guest appearances in Moon Knight and The Amazing Spider-Man, the group is thrust into the events of "Secret Invasion", when Thunderbolt Mountain is attacked by the Skrull Khn'nr, also known as Skrull sleeper agent Captain Marvel, just as Arnim Zola drops off the newly resurrected (via cloning technology) Andrea Strucker.

Barely surviving the fight due to Khn'ner's inability to deal with the implanted memories inside of him belonging to Mar-Vell, the group went onto the offensive against the Skrull armada as they invaded Washington DC. During the fight, Andrea is teamed with her brother Swordsman, Moonstone and Bullseye under the fear that she is a Skrull spy sent to infiltrate the group. However, when Moonstone betrays Swordsman in order to join forces with the Skrulls in order to bait Andrea into revealing herself to be a Skrull, she is shocked to realize that she is a clone, culminating in Bullseye murdering her in order to save Moonstone. With Norman's help, Moonstone blames the Skrulls for Andrea's murder. After the Thunderbolts defeat the Skrull armada attacking Washington, D.C., as well as two Super-Skrulls, Norman begins to play up his and his team's role to the media, making them appear to be the force that is saving the Earth from Tony Stark's bungling. The Thunderbolts then journey to New York where they reluctantly aid Earth's heroes in their battle against the Skrulls.

H.A.M.M.E.R.'s Thunderbolts
After Songbird gets mad at Osborn for leaving her to deal with a dangerous Skrull who nearly killed her, Norman Osborn and Moonstone come to the agreement to get rid of Songbird and the other Thunderbolts whose morals do not match their own. Their plan comes into effect while Norman is in Washington during the Dark Reign storyline, preparing to assume control over S.H.I.E.L.D. The group deports Radioactive Man back to China after Norman has his work visa revoked, and Moonstone has Penance sent to a corrupt maximum security mental institution where he would be held prisoner for the rest of his natural life. Moonstone then aids Bullseye and Venom in attempting to kill Songbird, with Bullseye and Moonstone inadvertently and indirectly revealing to Songbird that Norman has given them permission to kill her. Though she neutralizes Moonstone and Bullseye, Venom attacks Songbird on the Zeus minijet; she barely survives the crash. Bullseye recovers and sneaks up on her after the wreck, but the Swordsman saves her and tells her to run away, while blowing up the downed craft to forge her death in the explosion.

Swordsman confronts Norman with the revelation that he is not being offered a position on the "Dark Avengers" team and that Norman had never planned on fulfilling his vow to resurrect the Thunderbolt's deceased sister or to give him a full presidential pardon after his contract with the Thunderbolts ended. Norman ends the confrontation by stabbing and defenestrating him.

With Bullseye, Moonstone, and Venom being transferred to Norman's new team the Dark Avengers, Osborn decided to create a new Thunderbolts roster, one that would provide themselves as assassins for H.A.M.M.E.R.

The new roster consisted of:
 Black Widow
 Ghost
 Paladin
 Headsman
 Ant-Man
 Grizzly
 Scourge (Field leader)
 Mister X

One of their first missions is an attempt to kill Deadpool after he tries to blackmail Osborn for Norman's theft of Skrull data. After Deadpool and Taskmaster thwart the hit, the Thunderbolts then travel to Madripoor to recruit Mister X as a team member. Osborn then adds a new incarnation of Scourge, who Norman seems to know. Songbird eventually returns, and he has his team try to kill her. Yelena abandons the team after Scourge takes over, and reveals to Songbird that she is, in fact, the original Natasha Romanoff working for Nick Fury. The two escape, only to end up leading Osborn to Nick Fury. Osborn orders the Thunderbolts to kill Black Widow and Songbird, and shoots Fury himself; however, "Fury" is revealed to be a Life Model Decoy. After Black Widow and Songbird escape, Scourge is revealed to be the former Super-Soldier Nuke.

Norman Osborn later places Grizzly on the Thunderbolts team at the time they fight the Agents of Atlas. The fight between the Thunderbolts and the Agents of Atlas rages on as the deadly chemicals causes both teams to retreat. During the battle Scourge is brainwashed into shooting when he sees Norman Osborn. As the Thunderbolts return to the Cube on Zeus, their pilots informs that there is an important message from Osborn, Displayed holographically, Osborn informs the Thunderbolts that there is an important assignment he needs them to do in Broxton, Oklahoma, but does not disclose the details. Upon seeing Osborns' face, "Scourge's" programming kicks him and attempts to shoot. The bullet goes right through the hologram and hits Headsman right in the head, horrifying his teammates.

During the Siege storyline, Norman Osborn sends his Thunderbolts to infiltrate Asgard and steal a weapon from the Asgardian armory that will turn the tide in his favor.

The weapon that the Thunderbolts stole from the Asgardian armory was actually Odin's spear. They were stopped by the Mighty Avengers but not before Scourge used the spear to sever U.S. Agent's left limbs. Most of the team is apprehended by authorities while Paladin and Ant-Man escape.

Luke Cage's Thunderbolts
A brand new team of Thunderbolts appears in the aftermath of "Siege" as seen during the Heroic Age storyline.
 
Captain Steve Rogers brings Luke Cage to the Raft to assemble a new team of Thunderbolts that will not be related to the ones that Norman Osborn previously assembled and rather be criminals who work towards redemption again. They recruit Ghost (who betrayed Osborn), Moonstone (despite objections by long-standing member Songbird), Juggernaut (who is vouched for by Professor X), Crossbones (who is supposed to gravitate the rest of the Thunderbolts to Cage), and Man-Thing (who serves as the Thunderbolts' mode of transportation). No longer wearing a costume and now stuck in a wheelchair, U.S. Agent is appointed the new warden of the Raft. During their first training session, Luke Cage is attacked by Baron Helmut Zemo, who declares that he will take leadership of the Thunderbolts. He tells the Thunderbolts that they can serve him if they can escape from the Raft. Though Crossbones is more than willing to oblige, the rest are suspicious. As it turns out, it was a setup to test the team and the Raft's security measures. They are then deployed to deal with a group of Asgardian trolls.

After killing two of the trolls and capturing the third (who turned out to be a girl named Gunna who was raised by trolls), the group is reprimanded by Cage for the death of the two trolls. The Thunderbolts are sent out to search for a group of missing S.H.I.E.L.D. agents, who turn out to be mutated by the Terrigen Mist.

After slaying the mutated S.H.I.E.L.D. agents and sealing off the cave, the Thunderbolts return to the Raft for a check-up. The check-up reveals that Crossbones has not been mutated by the Terrigen Mist and that MACH-V will be out for weeks. The facility is soon visited by the staff and students of Avengers Academy. After getting Thunderbolts introduced to the students, the prison's power grid suddenly shut down due to an EMP, allowing the Raft's inmates to escape. Together with Warden Walker (U.S. Agent) and the staff of Avengers Academy, the Thunderbolts manage to detain all escaped prisoners. Some of Hank Pym's students attempted to get to Norman Osborn, so Luke Cage reprimands them.

During the Shadowland storyline, the Thunderbolts are assigned with rescuing a young boy who is held prisoner by the Hand, and bringing down their stronghold. While fighting the ninjas, Fixer is stabbed, while Songbird is taken down, giving Moonstone the opportunity to do things her way.

Following the dischargement of Crossbones, the Thunderbolts end up getting Hyperion as a new member when it comes to fighting giant monsters. He betrays the Thunderbolts while they are split up, destroying Man-Thing's lower body and legs with his atomic vision and leaving Moonstone and Songbird to drown while he takes the com device which controls the nanites in each Thunderbolts member. Hyperion activates it on Juggernaut to test it after the latter had saved the two drowning members, and Juggernaut responds by fighting back. Moonstone and Ghost join in to help Juggernaut upon which they take down Hyperion. They let Man-Thing touch him after a fallen Hyperion shows fear in front of them. The Thunderbolts next recruit Satana as his replacement when Luke Cage and Doctor Strange discover that the Raft is susceptible to magic.

With recent events involving the Thunderbolts, the team's advisory committee approve the creation of a Beta team, the Underbolts. As the Thunderbolts head toward a new mission in Eastern Europe, Songbird, Mach V, and Fixer select candidates of Raft inmates, with the chosen candidates being Troll, Shocker, Centurius, Boomerang and Mister Hyde.

After the mission in Europe as seen during the Fear Itself storyline, Juggernaut gets infected with nanites by Cage, who erroneously thought that he will attack the others. Juggernaut is left at the Raft while the alpha and beta team went on to a mission in Iraq, as zombies emerge from the area. In that moment, a Worthy hammer falls inside the prison and is taken immediately by Juggernaut (who feels also the calling of Cytorak). The hammer ends up transforming Kuurth: Breaker of Stone who ends up destroying the Raft, which led to most of its inmates escaping. The alpha and beta teams are called back to the raft to capture and control inmates, and work to clear the rubble. During the process, Centurius manages to find the controls for the beta team's nanites and disable them. The beta team decides to wait for a better time to escape, as they reason that more heroes may be on the way to help the raft. Meanwhile, Moonstone restores order to the partially collapsed women's wing of the prison, as Ghost helps the warden avert a crisis in a section of the prison where a malfunctioning failsafe is suffocating inmates. Crossbones, an ex-member of the Thunderbolts, with the help of another inmate, escapes the raft in the chaos. After order is restored, the alpha team, including Songbird and Mach V, is sent to subdue Juggernaut/Kuurth, with the beta team and Fixer held in reserve. To the team's surprise, Man-Thing becomes uncontrollable, and teleports away before they fight Juggernaut. Satana explains that he has reached the "next stage" of his evolution, but before she can finish explaining, Juggernaut arrives. The team tries to free Juggernaut from the hammer's influence, but fail and he escapes.

Thunderbolts Throughout Time
Upon being sent back in time to the World War II era, the Thunderbolts members end up passing themselves off as the American Thunderbolts when they end up helping the World War II era's versions of Captain America and Namor. As Centurius adapts the name of Doc Century for this time period, the American Thunderbolts continue their fight with the Nazis and the Human Torch androids that were created by Baron Heinrich Zemo.

From then on the book focuses on the team in the present (Luke Cage, MACH-V, Songbird, Ghost) versus the Underbolts team in the past (Centurius, Satana, Troll, Boomerang, Moonstone, Fixer). Eventually, jumping around in time, the team encounter themselves as the original Thunderbolts (1997) and ends with the renaming of the title into Dark Avengers although the storyline carries through.

Red Hulk's Thunderbolts
A new team composed of Red Hulk, Deadpool, Elektra, Agent Venom, and Punisher debuted as a part of Marvel NOW! major relaunch. Written by Daniel Way with drawings by Steve Dillon. This incarnation is not a government-sponsored team.

Red Hulk assembles his incarnation of the Thunderbolts to be a strike team that is close to "Code Red." He has gathered Deadpool, Elektra, Punisher, and Agent Venom because "their conditions cannot be cured." Red Hulk has his Thunderbolts do things that are similar to X-Force. Red Hulk has obtained Samuel Sterns' body and hooks it up to a machine that emits Red Gamma Radiation onto Samuel Sterns. Deadpool later finds Samuel Sterns' as a Red Leader with no apparent powers as he expresses his view that the Punisher won't be pleased. Punisher finds Red Leader's body and shoots him between the eyes disrupting whatever plans Red Hulk has for Red Leader.

Red Hulk brings the Thunderbolts along to deal with gamma technology on the island of Kata Jaya where the technology was supplied by Madman. During the fight against Madman, Red Hulk took the Leader to a pipe line that feeds Gamma energy to Madman's lab. Red Hulk then absorbed the energy himself and then forced fed it to the Leader, bringing him back to life. Red Leader is revived, but doesn't possess his prior intellect. They do get into the Madman's bunker to find out that The Leader hid his intellect on the internet. Madman confronts them and Leader promises to unlock his intellect to his brother, but after whispering one secret word his brother drops dead—his brain not being able to handle all of the information.

The team then follows leads for the supplies of the gamma radiation technology to Kabul to discover Elektra's brother Orestez Natchios is creating an army of Crimson Dynamos powered by gamma radiation. Elektra runs off with her brother and claims to have killed him, but Punisher realizes she was lying and kills him himself. During this fiasco, the Red Leader secretly gains access to the internet and downloads his intellect off the internet despite his body not being able to physically contain it (he suffers from profuse nose bleeds).

The Team decides that they can't do only missions for Red Hulk, as none truly trust him, so a system of give and take missions is developed, in which the team does a mission for General Ross, then a mission for a random member. The first random name pulled for a member is Punisher, who chooses a mission to take out a crime family in New York. The story arc takes place during the crossover event Infinity. It turns out the Leader purposefully tricked the team into letting him pick the next mission, since he had no skin in the game, so he can escape. He wasn't expecting an alien invasion. While trying to escape the team's submarine, Red Leader begins to get his brain siphoned by Supergiant of Thanos' Black Order, but is saved by Red Hulk. He reluctantly releases Mercy and is forced by Red Hulk to trick her into destroying the Black Order's flag ship. Afterwards, Red Leader starts having visions of how to kill every member of the Team, but determines that something is wrong with his plan, there was an unseen variable that stopped him from succeeding. That variable presents itself mainly in the form of Abigail Mercy, who joined Ross's Thunderbolts team as a condition for her release.

Ghost Rider joins the team in order to stop Mercy, who is getting too powerful to control, but inadvertently drags the team to hell. Leader negotiates a contract with Mephisto to put him back in power of the Underworld by overthrowing the current leader of hell, Strong Guy, who gave up his soul to save his love. Strong Guy throws the fight, so the Thunderbolts escape and Mercy is dragged to hell.

Deadpool's name gets pulled next for a mission and he wants to kidnap actor Ryan Reynolds, but Venom asks to be given the mission, as he is leaving the team. He wants to let the symbiote take over and have the team fight it, which they do, to reassure him that if he would lose control of the symbiote, there would be someone that could stop him.

The team then travels to a haunted swamp in Honduras to find an ancient artifact. Leader is the only one who can translate the ancient language. During the boat ride, Leader whispers something cryptic from an ancient language and Johnny Blaze loses his powers and is killed by a tentacled monster. Leader then betrays the team by promising their river guide to help ambush the team, but then doubles crosses him and alerts the team, who them quickly dispose of the ambushers. Leader then tricks the team into entering the secret temple via booby trapped entrance. Ross survives and finds the power of the temple, an infant celestial head. Leader attempts to drink the Celestial's blood, but this causes his brain to explode. One of Ross' former squadmates, Mancuso, is waiting for him and powered by the Celestial. Mancuso warns him that if Ross continues his selfish ways he will be forced to use his cosmic powers to kill him. Ross realizes that he pushes his team too hard and constantly endangers them, so Mansuco teleports them back to before the briefing. Ross decides not to travel to Honduras.

Much later, the team tracked down Doctor Faustus. The Punisher wanted to kill him for murdering all the children in a high school. Red Hulk stopped him and wanted to recruit Faustus, but the Punisher does not like the idea and quits the team. While going to the refrigerator at his safe house, the Punisher found a bomb with a note saying "You don't quit on us. You're fired." Angered, the Punisher believes Red Hulk set the bomb and began hunting down his former teammates. He snipers Leader and Faustus. He decapitates Deadpool, who is not angry and actually flattered that Frank found him a threat. He steals magic regalia from Bloodstone and depowers Ghost Rider, but Johnny Blaze is actually glad to be freed of the demon. Punisher can't bring himself to kill Elektra, but does confess that he killed her brother. She then admits she knew he would kill her brother. Punisher then uses a customized Hulkbuster armor with a special gun that depowers Red Hulk temporarily. During a gruesome hand-to-hand combat between Ross and Castle, Hawkeye and his new team of Avengers arrest both of them. It is later revealed that Red Leader was alive and set the bomb knowing the Punisher will come after each member of the Thunderbolts and set a Life Model Decoy to fool the other Thunderbolts. The Avengers and Thunderbolts return to Kata Jaya and arrest Leader who is their new dictator. Ross then decides to disband the team.

The annual takes place before the team disbands and follow the team as they work up with W.A.N.D., S.H.I.E.L.D.'s paranormal research department, in order to take down an out of control Doctor Strange.

Winter Soldier's Thunderbolts
The Winter Soldier formed his own Thunderbolts team following the events of the Avengers: Standoff! storyline. Besides Winter Soldier, the membership consisted of Fixer, Atlas, Moonstone, MACH-X, and Kobik. Winter Soldier, Kobik, and MACH-X helped Fixer, Atlas, and Moonstone evade S.H.I.E.L.D. In exchange, they agree to form the Thunderbolts with the mission to make sure that S.H.I.E.L.D. never uses the Kobik Project again.

Over the course of this 12-issue run, Bucky's Thunderbolts team clashes with the All-New Inhumans, Squadron Supreme, mysterious alien invaders and others. They also frequently test the limits of Kobik's terrifying, reality-bending cosmic powers. The girl is the one who magically manifests the team's arctic headquarters and even resolves Fixer's time travel-loop conundrum that has lingered since the "Thunderbolts Throughout Time" storyline.

Following the "Civil War II" event, the team reunites with Songbird as they rescue Bucky from an altered, secretly fascist Captain America. She remains with the team, briefly reuniting her romance with Abe Jenkins (MACH-X). In the lead up to the "Secret Empire" event, Zemo attacks the Thunderbolts' base with the latest incarnation of the Masters of Evil. As that confrontation begins to unfold, Jolt is transported back from Counter Earth just in time to save Atlas from arctic exposure.

Later, Zemo makes a nefarious offer the original Thunderbolts members: give in to their darker natures and join the new rise of Hydra... or die. Abe and Melissa reject the offer, but Fixer, Moonstone, and Atlas ultimately leave the ruins of the HQ with Zemo's Masters of Evil. In the aftermath of the destruction, Songbird scours the snowy horizon for Abe, who is presumed dead, while Ghost—who has been spying on the Thunderbolts for some time—rescues a pocket-sized Jolt, who has shrunk due to her power exertion during the battle with the Masters of Evil.

Punisher: War on the Streets
After losing custody of Frank Castle in the fledgling country of Bagalia, Baron Zemo and Jigsaw flee to New York City. There, Zemo approaches the Mayor Wilson Fisk, in hopes of joining forces and finally taking on revenge on the Punisher. Fearing a public relations disaster, Mayor Fisk reluctantly agrees—and is promptly dismayed when Zemo reveals a new team of Thunderbolts at a mayoral press conference.

Zemo's new Thunderbolts team includes:

 Citizen V (Baron Zemo in disguise)
 Moonstone
 Ghost
 Fixer
 Radioactive Man
 Jigsaw (in disguise)

Mayor Fisk and Citizen V announce to a cheering crowd that the Thunderbolts will work with newly arrived U.N. forces (who are, in fact, Zemo's disguised Hydra soldiers) and a covert team of NYPD officers to rid the city of Punisher.

Zemo and his team are able to surprise Frank Castle once, but are thwarted by Black Widow. Moonstone and Mayor Fisk ultimately goad an over-confident Zemo into confronting Punisher again and "Citizen V" musters a rousing speech to rally spooked Hydra agents. The Thunderbolts then clash with Castle again—but discover that the vigilante has reluctantly partnered with a team of other street-level operatives, including Black Widow, Moon Knight, Rachel Cole-Alves, and even Frank's old Thunderbolts teammate, Ghost Rider. The battle is fierce and even though Frank shoots down Fixer (or possibly a robotic copy) and corners "Citizen V," Jigsaw intervenes... and the Thunderbolts escape with Rachel as a hostage. As they flee, Zemo challenges Frank to come retrieve her... alone.

The ploy doesn't work. Punisher and Zemo battle at Fisk Tower. Before Frank can kill Zemo, Ghost intervenes. Calling Zemo "a third-rate fascist with an inherited army," Ghost tells the defeated Zemo to return to Bagalia and wire him his money. Punisher wards Ghost off and Zemo is able to meet Mayor Fisk on the roof, hoping to rally a comeback. Instead, Mayor Fisk tells Zemo that he's in over his head. At the touch of Ghost's hand, Zemo is seemingly vaporized. Fisk thanks Ghost and tells him that they'll discuss "the details of their arrangement" later.

Mayor Wilson Fisk's Thunderbolts
When the symbiote god Knull encircles the planet in symbiote goo and sets out to destroy every living thing on Earth, Mayor Wilson Fisk decides to put together his own team of superpowered operatives to beat back Knull's creatures and save the city. He secretly meets with eight of these operatives, all known criminals who have been working in the city without Kingpin's blessing:

 Taskmaster
 Mister Fear
 Batroc the Leaper
 Rhino
 Star (Ripley Ryan)
 Ampere
 Snakehead

To pay Kingpin back, these criminals must escort Star (current keeper of one of the Infinity Gems) into battle to kill Knull, but to do that they'll first need to make contact with a man Kingpin believes can help turn the tide against the god. Only one of the criminals, Incendiary, opts to take his chances in jail instead, but when he's taken out of the boardroom by Kingpin's guards, he's immediately shot. The remaining seven criminals then promptly agree to Kingpin's plan. Despite objections, this team will be called "The Thunderbolts" (because Kingpin owns the copyright). The team sets out into the city and is promptly attacked by a giant Symbiote Dragon. Snakehead is devoured, but Mister Fear and Star are able to fell the Symbiote Dragon. The team learns that there's a limit to Star's cosmic powers (she's woozy after battle) and when Ampere exclaims that the team is doomed and he's leaving, Mister Fear murders him. Taskmaster, de facto team leader, scolds Mister Fear, but the team helps themselves to Ampere's electric gauntlets, giving Taskmaster and Batroc's abilities an extra kick. Taskmaster can't keep Rhino from walking away from the team. Then he shortly makes the call not to help the Manhattan Defenders battle more symbiote creatures. As the dwindled team slinks away from the scene, they're attacked by symbiote creature that's possessed Ampere's corpse and, before they know it, are being chased by a hoard of ravenous symbiotes. The team escapes to a fishing boat—nearly leaving Batroc behind—and finally reach their destination: The Ravencroft Institute. Inside they find the man Kingpin believes can defeat Knull: notorious supervillain and former Thunderbolts leader Norman Osborn. Norman Osborn and the Thunderbolts make their way through Ravencroft amidst the Symbiote attacks where they joined up by Figment, Foolkiller, Grizzly, Man-Bull, and Mister Hyde. While noting that Sentry would've been able to fight Knull, it was noted that Knull defeated him and absorbed Void. Osborn then leads the Thunderbolts into retrieving Sentry's corpse so that it can be used as a nuke to destroy Knull's lair on top of the Empire State Building with it being a suicide mission. Foolkiller was taken over by one of the Symbiotes and was killed. Taskmaster used Figment's abilities to make it look like the Thunderbolts sacrificed their lives to pull off the mission. After Mayor Fisk broadcasts the Thunderbolts' sacrifice during the fight against the Symbiote invasion, the Thunderbolts arrive and blackmail him into raising their pay and giving them further missions once Knull is defeated.

Devil's Reign
During the "Devil's Reign" storyline, Mayor Wilson Fisk sets up the expanded Thunderbolts units to help crack down on superhuman vigilantism while partnering up with Senator Arthur Krane of the Friends of Humanity and other benefactors. These Thunderbolts units are tasked to assist the NYPD and take down the superheroes. Moon Knight is the first to be apprehended by Agony, Electro II, Rhino, and U.S. Agent. Doctor Octopus accompanied the NYPD and Homeland Security to the Baxter Building to do a full investigation on the weapons of mass destruction that might be located there. Reed Richards and Susan Storm are apprehended, but Susan manages to get a Code X7 off to Human Torch and Thing who evacuate Franklin Richards and Valeria Richards. Shocker apprehends Darkhawk, but is subdued by Luke Cage and Jessica Jones when he tries to get them to surrender. At the Rand Corporation, Danny Rand is attacked by the NYPD with Crossbones leading them. Rand was later mentioned to have been apprehended. At the Daily Bugle, Taskmaster and Whiplash do a hostage sitatution to draw out Spider-Man. They badly beat him up and leave him for the NYPD on the streets below. After a confrontation with Mayor Fisk, Elektra in her Daredevil appearance is hunted by Kraven the Hunter. Serpent Society members Coachwhip and Puff Adder appear as members of the Thunderbolts when they were targeting Spider-Woman. At the time when the Thunderbolts managed to apprehend most of the Purple Children, Jessica Jones and the Champions tried to rescue them only to be repelled by the Thunderbolts' latest member Abomination. The recruitment of Abomination was the result of Rhino leaving the group as he believed hunting children crossed the line.

Following Kingpin's defeat, Mayor Luke Cage deals with the remainder of the Thunderbolts units that were loyal to Kingpin with help from Spectrum. A public relations specialist named Helen Astrantia has been tasked to re-frame the Thunderbolts. She and Mayor Cage plan to ask Hawkeye to lead the Thunderbolts since Black Knight, Falcon, Mockingbird, Spectrum, and Wasp don't want the job.

Hawkeye's Thunderbolts
Hawkeye is eventually chosen to lead the Thunderbolts with America Chavez, Power Man, Persuasion, and a new character named Gutsen Glory whose background and how Helen Astrantia obtained his services are classified. Their first mission has them apprehending Abomination, Agony, Electro II, Taskmaster, and Whiplash who broke out of a prison transport and were holding hostages. Hawkeye takes on U.S. Agent who claims that he is still working for the government. Most of its members are defeated as Spectrum shows up to defeat Electro II. In a discussion with Mayor Luke Cage on if she wants to stick around and help the Thunderbolts, Spectrum states that she'll think about it. After Mayor Luke Cage and Hawkeye's press conference regarding the fight with the escaped prisoners and U.S. Agent, Hawkeye and the Thunderbolts are dispatched by Helen Astrantia to the Metropolitan Musem of Art to deal with a creature inside it. The Thunderbolts have difficulty with the creature until Spectrum joins the fight. The creature surrenders and introduces itself as Eegro the Unbreakable from Monster Isle. Later that day, Helen persuades Hawkeye to take Eegro the Unbreakable in as the latest member of the Thunderbolts as Spectrum decides to join the group. After spending a night with Blue Marvel, Spectrum joins the Thunderbolts in a training mission in Central Park as Helen Astrantia arrives straight from a perfume photo shoot with Persuasion and Eergo the Unbreakable as she states to Hawkeye that he will not need to wear his mask. Then she dispatches the Thunderbolts to the Central Park Zoo which has been taken over by the Super-Apes who have declared themselves free from Red Ghost. They are now led by a powered-up chimpanzee named Yaroslavi. The Super-Apes give the Thunderbolts difficulty until the police unleashing knockout gas in the area. As Mayor Cage and Helen talk about the latest bad press about the Thunderbolts, Gutsen Glory mentions the flaws that Hawkeye and Spectrum have while America Chavez and Power Man ride the subway until America collapses. Later that night, Hawkeye makes a call to Mockingbird. Persuasion and Eergo the Unbreakable are interviewed on a talk show about Persuasion's perfume and the Thunderbolts as Hawkeye has spent the night with Mockingbird as a guest. Later that day, the Thunderbolts face off against Melter and Whirlwind who are holding hostages until the Thunderbolts defeated them. Hawkeye is later interviewed where Black Widow, Mockingbird, and Helen Astrania are present. The Thunderbolts then respond to an attack caused by Terminus as Hawkeye hears a voice in his head taunting him. Meanwhile, the EMTs respond to America Chavez' collapse as Power Man has been doing some CPR. When Helen goes to Hawkeye's apartment to check up on him, she finds Hawkeye floating above his bed with his eyes glowing. As Hawkeye has a vision of him and the Thunderbolts being zapped by Terminus, it is shown that Nightmare is responsible as he plans to use America Chavez' powers to access the Multiverse and take over its respectful waking worlds. While noting that he wanted to torment Hawkeye again, he changed his plans and started tormenting the Thunderbolts while planning to take advantage of America Chavez. Following nightmares about Dormammu and the Mindless Ones, Thanos, the Marvel Zombies, and Galactus, America Chavez breaks free and frees the other Thunderbolts members from their nightmares. As the Thunderbolts fight Nightmare, Eergo the Unbreakable unleashes his ultimate attack that involves him growing as he smashes Nightmare. As Nightmare gets back up, Persuasion uses her powers to mind-control Nightmare into going to sleep. After the fight, Helen Astrania is told by America Chavez that Nightmare was dropped into a dimension where he'll be asleep for a long time. Though she does mention the budget problems when it comes to shrinking Eergo the Unbreakable back to his normal size much to his dismay. The next morning, Hawkeye is doing some archery when he is visited by Mayor Luke Cage who states that Hawkeye is on probation and expects more from the Thunderbolts. Mayor Cage then takes his leave stating that he'll see Hawkeye on Monday. Then Hawkeye calls up Mockingbird and asks if she wants to go out for coffee since she is in town. He gets a positive response and states that he will see her soon.

Members

Slogan
Justice, like lightning, ever should appear to few men's ruin, but to all men's fear.

The series' slogan, "Justice, Like Lightning..." was attributed to a poem by Thomas Randolph in Thunderbolts #1. However, upon further investigation, Kurt Busiek could not find any evidence that this phrase had actually appeared in Thomas Randolph's writings. Busiek himself had originally taken the slogan from the Roy Thomas-penned issues of Captain Marvel, where the quote was similarly attributed to Randolph.

The quote is frequently attributed to Joseph Swetnam, but this was not Swetnam himself, but rather a character based on him in the 1620 play Swetnam the Woman-Hater Arraigned by Women, which was written by an unknown author. Busiek reports that one Thunderbolts fan located a version of the couplet attributed to Irish archbishop Milo Sweetman, who died in 1380.

Reception

Accolades 
 In 2020, CBR.com ranked the Thunderbolts 10th in their "Marvel: 10 Most Powerful Teams" list.
 In 2021, CBR.com ranked the Thunderbolts 3rd in their "Marvel: 10 Characters Baron Zemo Created In The Comics" list.
 In 2022, CBR.com ranked the Thunderbolts 2nd in their "10 Marvel Teams That Exceeded Expectations" list.

Other versions

Contest of Champions
The 2015 Contest of Champions comic series features a universe where Iron Man and the Pro-Registration won Civil War with everything going in Tony's favor for five years. The Thunderbolts in this universe are members of Captain America's Anti-Registration team who buy time off their sentence with suicide missions from the government, similar to DC's Suicide Squad. This version of the team is led by Steve Rogers and is composed of Spider-Man, Invisible Woman, Goliath, and the Punisher. When President Stark and his Mighty Avengers are kidnapped by Maestro and sent to Battleworld, the government sends the Thunderbolts to retrieve them. After a fight breaks out between them, the Mighty Avengers, and the Renegade Champions, Tony kills Steve and reveals that he used the Reality Gem to rig the war in his favor. Tony attempts to use the Gem on Battleworld to achieve a similar feat, but since he is no longer in his universe, the Gem is powerless, and he and the Punisher are swiftly killed by the Maestro. The surviving Mighty Avengers and Thunderbolts stay behind on Battleworld after the fight and dub themselves the Civil Warriors.

"Fightbolts"
From Thunderbolts #76-81, the Thunderbolts were no longer featured. The focus of the comic shifted to Daniel Axum, a former supervillain known as the Battler. Axum joined an underground fighting circuit that employed other supervillains, including the Armadillo. Axum, along with fellow combatant Man-Killer, turned on his criminal manager Rey Trueno, and refused to return to the supervillain lifestyle. Despite continuing the title and numbering, this incarnation had no connection to the better-known team listed above, and the title was cancelled six issues into this direction.

Marvel Zombies
In Marvel Zombies: Dead Days, zombified Thunderbolts appear, rampaging across New York. The undead Thunderbolts are killed by the combined forces of Nova, Thor, and the Fantastic Four.

MC2
While the majority of the Thunderbolts have yet to appear in the MC2 Universe, Jolt appeared as an Avenger before the current team assembled in A-Next #1.

Spider-Girl introduces a government team for reformed villains, similar to the Thunderbolts, consisting of:
 Big Man (son of Hank Pym and the Wasp). Former member of the Revengers.
 Kaine (clone of Spider-Man).
 Normie Osborn (grandson of the Green Goblin). Host of the Venom symbiote.
 Quickwire
 Raptor (daughter of the second Vulture).

As of Amazing Spider-Girl #9, the team consists of Killerwatt (in a new costume), Mr. Abnormal, Kaine, and Earthshaker.

Millennial Visions
In the story "Thunderbolts: Give a Guy a Break", in the Marvel Universe: Millennial Visions one-shot (set in Earth-22000), the Thunderbolts revolt against Zemo, and Hawkeye leads them on to be true heroes, bringing in and converting other villains.

Spider-Verse
A version of the Thunderbolts (Earth-138) appear as the police and fire department of the regime of President Norman "Ozzy" Osborn. Known as the Thunderbolt Department, they are equipped with the universe's version of the Venom Symbiote, Variable Engagement Neuro-sensitive Organic Mesh or V.E.N.O.M and joins President Osborn's campaign against Spider-Punk and his Spider-Army.

Wolverine: Days of Future Past
In the limited series, Wolverine: Days of Future Past, the Thunderbolts are the private security force of the ruling Sentinels, under the command of Baron Zemo. However, Zemo is also secretly working with Shinobi Shaw and Psylocke as part of a new Hellfire Club to bring about the Sentinels' downfall.

Old Man Logan
In Old Man Hawkeye, a prequel to Old Man Logan, it is revealed that Baron Zemo coerced the Thunderbolts into betraying the Avengers and allying with the villains, killing nearly every hero except for Hawkeye, whom they left out of spite. The plot of the prequel comic revolves around an older Hawkeye hunting down the former Thunderbolts to avenge his fallen comrades.

In other media

Television
 A loose depiction of Norman Osborn's Thunderbolts appears in the Ultimate Spider-Man episode "New Warriors". This version of the group is a team of young superhumans established by Taskmaster and consists of Cloak and Dagger and the Vulture, with the Green Goblin as a silent benefactor. The group's mission is to raid the S.H.I.E.L.D. Tri-Carrier to break the Goblin out of S.H.I.E.L.D. custody, though they and the Sinister Six end up fighting Spider-Man and the New Warriors. The various battles result in Cloak and Dagger defecting to Spider-Man's side and Taskmaster being apprehended while Vulture and the Goblin escape.
 Baron Helmut Zemo's Thunderbolts appear in Avengers Assemble, consisting of Citizen V, MACH-IV, Songbird, Atlas, Meteorite, and Techno. Similarly to the comics, this version of the group are the Masters of Evil, who use an inversion stabilizer to disguise themselves and masquerade as superheroes. Throughout their self-titled episode and "Thunderbolts Revealed", the Thunderbolts work with the Avengers until a suspicious Hawkeye discovers the Thunderbolts' true identities. In the ensuing fight, Captain America inspires Songbird to legitimately become a hero and convince her teammates to expose Zemo and turn on him. Though Zemo escapes, Hawkeye advises the remaining Thunderbolts to turn themselves in and work towards being official heroes once they serve their time.
 A band inspired by the Thunderbolts called "Screaming Mimi and the Thunderbolts" appear in the Marvel Rising short "Battle of the Bands", led by Melissa Gold and consisting of Atlas, Jolt and Moonstone look-a-likes.

Film
By June 2022, Thunderbolts was in development at Marvel Studios, with Jake Schreier attached to direct and Eric Pearson writing the screenplay. Filming is expected to begin in June 2023. It is scheduled to be the second-to-last film in Phase Five of the Marvel Cinematic Universe, with a release date of July 26, 2024. The group will consist of Bucky Barnes (Sebastian Stan), Ghost (Hannah John-Kamen), U.S. Agent (Wyatt Russell), Valentina Allegra de Fontaine (Julia Louis-Dreyfus), Yelena Belova (Florence Pugh), Red Guardian (David Harbour), and Taskmaster (Olga Kurylenko).

Video games
 The Thunderbolts appear Marvel: Ultimate Alliance 2, consisting of Penance, Songbird, Venom, and the Green Goblin.
 The original Thunderbolts appear in Lego Marvel's Avengers as part of a self-titled DLC pack, consisting of Citizen V, Atlas, Jolt, Techno, MACH-V, Meteorite, and Songbird.

Miscellaneous
 The Thunderbolts co-starred with the Avengers in the original prose fiction novel Avengers and the Thunderbolts, written by Pierce Askegren and published by Berkley (259 pages, paperback, January 1999).
 Action figures of Songbird, Citizen V, MACH-I, and Boomerang as Thunderbolts have all been released as part of Hasbro's Marvel Legends line.

Collected editions
The Thunderbolts' stories have been collected in a number of Marvel Omnibus oversized hardcovers and trade paperbacks:

Marvel Omnibus
Thunderbolts Omnibus:
Volume 1 (collects Thunderbolts (1997) #0, 1-33, Thunderbolts Annual 1997, Thunderbolts: Distant Rumblings (1997) #-1, Incredible Hulk (1968) #449, Spider-Man Team-Up (1995) #7, Heroes For Hire (1997) #7, Captain America & Citizen V Annual 1998, Avengers (1998) #12, and the Thunderbolts story from Tales of the Marvel Universe (1997) #1)
Volume 2 (collects Thunderbolts (1997) #34-63, Thunderbolts Annual 2000, Avengers (1998) #31-34, Avengers Annual 2000, Thunderbolts: Life Sentences (2001) #1, Thunderbolts: From the Marvel Vault (2011) #1, Citizen V and the V-Battalion (2001) #1-3, Citizen V and the V-Battalion: The Everlasting (2002) #1-4)
Volume 3 (collects Thunderbolts (1997) #64-75 and #100-109, Avengers/Thunderbolts #1-6, New Thunderbolts #1-18 and Thunderbolts Presents: Zemo - Born Better #1-4)
Thunderbolts: Uncaged Omnibus (collects Thunderbolts (2006) #144-174 and #163.1, Dark Avengers #175-190, and the Thunderbolts story from Enter the Heroic Age #1)

The Classic era
 Thunderbolts: Marvel's Most Wanted (collects the first appearances of the six original members from Captain America vol. 1 #168, The Incredible Hulk vol. 1 #228-229, Marvel Two-in-One #56, Strange Tales #123 and 141–143, Avengers vol. 1 #21-22, 176 pages, softcover, February 1998)
 Thunderbolts: First Strikes (collects Thunderbolts #1-2, 48 pages, softcover, December 1997)
 Thunderbolts: Justice Like Lightning... (collects Thunderbolts #1-4, Thunderbolts '97 Annual, The Incredible Hulk #449, Tales of the Marvel Universe special and Spider-Man Team-Up #7, 224 pages, softcover, December 2001)
 Thunderbolts Classic:
 Volume 1 (collects Thunderbolts #1-5, Thunderbolts: Distant Rumblings #-1, Thunderbolts '97 Annual, The Incredible Hulk #449, Tales of the Marvel Universe one-shot and Spider-Man Team-Up #7, 296 pages, April 2011)
 Volume 2 (collects Thunderbolts #6-14, and Heroes for Hire #7, 256 pages, March 2012)
 Volume 3 (collects Thunderbolts #15-22, 0, and Captain America & Citizen V Annual '98; Avengers Vol. 3 #12, 288 pages, softcover, August 15, 2012)
 Hawkeye and the Thunderbolts:
 Volume 1 (collects Thunderbolts #23-37, Thunderbolts Annual 2000, Avengers Annual 2000, 456 pages, softcover, May 3, 2016)
 Volume 2 (collects Thunderbolts #38-50, Avengers Vol. 3 #31-34; 440 pages July 2016 )
 The Avengers/Thunderbolts:
 Volume 1: The Nefaria Protocols (collects The Avengers #31-34 and Thunderbolts #42-44, 184 pages, softcover, March 2004)
 Volume 2: Best Intentions (collects Avengers/Thunderbolts #1-6, 144 pages, softcover, November 2004)

The "Fightbolts" era
 Thunderbolts: How to Lose (by John Arcudi, collects Thunderbolts #76-81, 120 pages, softcover, November 2003)

The New Thunderbolts era
 New Thunderbolts:
 Volume 1: One Step Forward (collects New Thunderbolts #1-6, 144 pages, softcover, June 2005)
 Volume 2: Modern Marvels (collects New Thunderbolts #7-12, 144 pages, softcover, November 2005)
 Volume 3: Right of Power (collects New Thunderbolts #13-18 and Thunderbolts #100, 184 pages, softcover, June 2006)
 Civil War: Thunderbolts (collects Thunderbolts #101-105, 120 pages, softcover, May 2007)
 Thunderbolts: The Guardian Protocols (collects Thunderbolts #106-109, 96 pages, July 2007)
 Thunderbolts Presents: Zemo - Born Better (by Fabian Nicieza, collects 4-issue mini-series, 96 pages, August 2007)

The post-Civil War era
 Thunderbolts by Warren Ellis and Mike Deodato Ultimate Collection (collects Thunderbolts #110-121 and material from Civil War: The Initiative one-shot, 296 pages, softcover, September 2011) covers the same core series issues as:
 Thunderbolts: Faith in Monsters (collects Thunderbolts #110-115, "Thunderbolts: Desperate Measures", Civil War: Choosing Sides and Civil War: The Initiative, 192 pages, hardcover, September 2007, softcover, January 2008)
 Thunderbolts: Caged Angels (collects Thunderbolts #116-121, 144 pages, hardcover, September 2008, softcover, December 2008)
 Thunderbolts: Secret Invasion (collects Thunderbolts: Breaking Point one-shot, Thunderbolts: International Incident one-shot, Thunderbolts: Reason in Madness and Thunderbolts #122-125, 168 pages, Marvel Comics, softcover, March 2009)
 Penance: Relentless (by Paul Jenkins, collects 5-issue limited series, 120 pages, July 2008)

The Dark Reign era
 Thunderbolts: Burning Down The House (collects Thunderbolts #126-129 and 132, 112 pages, hardcover, August 2009, softcover, November 2009)
 Dark Reign: Deadpool/Thunderbolts (collects Thunderbolts #130-131 and Deadpool vol. 2, #8-9, 96 pages, softcover, July 2009)
 Thunderbolts: Widowmaker (collects Thunderbolts #133-137, premiere hardcover, 120 pages, December 2009, softcover, May 2010)
 Siege: Thunderbolts (collects Thunderbolts #138-143, 144 pages, premiere hardcover, September 2010, softcover, January 2011)

The Heroic Age era
 Thunderbolts: Cage (collects Thunderbolts #144-147 and stories from Enter the Heroic Age one-shot, 112 pages, hardcover, October 2010, softcover, March 2011)
 Shadowland: Thunderbolts (collects Thunderbolts #148-151, 144 pages, hardcover, April 2011)
 Thunderbolts: Violent Rejection (collects Thunderbolts #152-157, 280 pages, softcover, August 2011)
 Fear Itself: Thunderbolts (collects Thunderbolts #158-162, 120 pages, hardcover, February 2012)
 Thunderbolts: The Great Escape (collects Thunderbolts #163, #163.1, 164–168, 168 pages, softcover, March 2012)
 Thunderbolts: Like Lightning (collects Thunderbolts #169-174, 144 pages, softcover, September 2012)
 Dark Avengers: The End is the Beginning (collects Dark Avengers #175-183, 208 pages, softcover, February 2013)
 Dark Avengers: Masters of Evil (collects Dark Avengers #184-190, 168 pages, softcover, July 2013)

The Marvel Now Era
 Thunderbolts Volume 1: No Quarter (collects Thunderbolts vol. 2 #1-6, 136, softcover, May 2013)
 Thunderbolts Volume 2: Red Scare (collects Thunderbolts vol. 2 #7-12, 136, softcover, October 2013)
 Thunderbolts Volume 3: Infinity (collects Thunderbolts vol. 2 #13-19, 136, softcover, January 2014)
 Thunderbolts Volume 4: No Mercy (collects Thunderbolts vol. 2 #20-26, 160, softcover, August 2014)
 Thunderbolts Volume 5: Punisher vs. the Thunderbolts (collects Thunderbolts Vol. 2 27–32, 168, softcover, January 2015)

See also
 Suicide Squad - DC Comics' equivalent to the Thunderbolts team

References

External links
 Thunderbolts at Marvel.com
 Comics 101: Thunderbolts
 Thunderbolts at the Marvel Directory
 
 Thunderbolts at the Unofficial Handbook of Marvel Comics Creators
 
 
 

1997 comics debuts
Characters created by Kurt Busiek
Characters created by Mark Bagley
Comics by Fabian Nicieza
Comics by Jim Zub
Comics by Kurt Busiek
Comics by Warren Ellis
Marvel Comics titles